Mini Sky City (小天城) is a 57-story, 204m high building in Changsha, the capital of Hunan province in China. It was built in 19 days in 2015 by Broad Sustainable Building, a subsidiary of China's Broad Group, using a modular construction system. The company has ambitions to use similar techniques to build a much larger project, Sky City, which is intended to be 220 stories tall. In 2017 mini Sky City was involved in international architectural competition SkyCity Challenge, where architects from around the world designed 17 of the hollow atriums located inside of the skyscraper.

References 

2015 establishments in China
Buildings and structures in Changsha